was a tennis player from Japan, and with Ichiya Kumagae was one of the first Japanese Olympic medalists. He won the Canadian Open by defeating United States player Walter K. Wesbrook 3–6, 6–3, 6–1, 11–9.

Biography
A native of Osaka, Kashio graduated from Tokyo Higher Commercial School (now Hitotsubashi University), and was subsequently employed by the trading company Mitsui & Co. and stationed at that company’s New York City branch office. He competed in the 1918 US Open, finishing in the third round. He also participated in the 1919 US Open, finishing in the second round.

At the 1920 Summer Olympics held in Antwerp, Belgium, Kashio was defeated in the third round of the singles competition. However, paired with Ichiya Kumagae, he won the silver medal in the men's doubles event. In the doubles final, Kashio and Kumagae lost to Oswald Turnbull and Max Woosnam of Great Britain: 2–6, 7–5, 5–7, and 5–7.

Kashio was a member of the first Japan Davis Cup team, which finished as runner-up in the 1921 International Lawn Tennis Challenge. He  subsequently partnered with Zenzo Shimizu in the 1923 Davis Cup, reaching the semi-finals. He appears to have retired from competition soon thereafter, and little is known of his subsequent career.

References

External links 
 
 
 
 
 

1892 births
1962 deaths
Hitotsubashi University alumni
Japanese male tennis players
Olympic tennis players of Japan
Olympic silver medalists for Japan
Sportspeople from Osaka Prefecture
Tennis players at the 1920 Summer Olympics
Olympic medalists in tennis
Medalists at the 1920 Summer Olympics